Major-General William Vesey Brownlow  (12 June 1841 – 15 March 1928) was a British Army officer.

Military career
Brownlow was commissioned as an ensign the 30th (Cambridgeshire) Regiment of Foot in April 1859. He served in the Anglo-Zulu War in 1879 and the First Boer War in 1880. During the First Boer War he was wounded and had his horse shot out from under him. He was rescued by Private John Doogan who was awarded the Victoria Cross for his action.

Brownlow became assistant commandant and superintendent at the Riding Establishment Cavalry Depot in May 1882 and commanded the 22nd Regimental District (the Cheshire Regiment) from 1889 to 1894. He went on to serve as colonel of the 1st King's Dragoon Guards from 1908 to 1926.

He lived at Boughton Hall in Great Boughton, Cheshire. He was also High Sheriff of Monaghan from 1907 to 1908.

Family
Brownlow married Lady Anne Henrietta, daughter of John Dalrymple, 10th Earl of Stair in November 1881. After the death of his first wife, he married Lady Kathleen Susan Emma, daughter of John Bligh, 6th Earl of Darnley in June 1904.

References

British Army major generals
1841 births
1928 deaths
British Army personnel of the Anglo-Zulu War
British military personnel of the First Boer War
Companions of the Order of the Bath
High Sheriffs of Monaghan
30th Regiment of Foot officers